Bald Peak is a mountain top and highest point in the Chehalem Mountains in the Northwest area of the U.S. state of Oregon. Located in Yamhill County near the county line with Washington County, the summit at 1624+ feet (495+ m) is the highest point in the Willamette Valley. Bald Peak State Scenic Viewpoint is a  state park located on the peak.

Geology
The mountain range that includes the peak is composed of a single land mass that was uplifted by tectonics. Bald Peak is both the highest part of the range and the highest point within the Willamette Valley.

References

External links 
Image from the peak. Oregon State Archives: Oregon Scenic Images of Yamhill County.

Mountains of Oregon
Landforms of Yamhill County, Oregon